Calguia defiguralis is a species of snout moth in the genus Calguia. It was described by Francis Walker in 1863. It is found in Borneo and Guangdong, China. It has also been recorded from Australia, Sri Lanka and Taiwan.

References

External links
 
 

Moths described in 1863
Phycitini